Alessandro "Sandro" Campagna (born 26 June 1963) is an Italian former water polo player who competed at the 1988 and 1992 Summer Olympics. He is now the head coach of the Italy men's national water polo team.

Career
Campagna won a gold medal at the Barcelona Olympics in 1992. As a head coach, he led Italy men's national team to win two medals in 2012 and 2016, becoming one of a few sportspeople who won Olympic medals in water polo as players and head coaches he then quit participating in the olympics because of the death of his wife in 2017. She died from a stroke.

He was inducted into the International Swimming Hall of Fame in 2019.

See also
 Italy men's Olympic water polo team records and statistics
 List of Olympic champions in men's water polo
 List of Olympic medalists in water polo (men)
 List of world champions in men's water polo
 List of World Aquatics Championships medalists in water polo
 List of members of the International Swimming Hall of Fame

References

External links
 

1963 births
Living people
Italian male water polo players
Olympic water polo players of Italy
Water polo players at the 1988 Summer Olympics
Water polo players at the 1992 Summer Olympics
Olympic gold medalists for Italy
Olympic medalists in water polo
Medalists at the 1992 Summer Olympics
World Aquatics Championships medalists in water polo
Italian water polo coaches
Greece men's national water polo team coaches
Italy men's national water polo team coaches
Water polo coaches at the 2004 Summer Olympics
Water polo coaches at the 2008 Summer Olympics
Water polo coaches at the 2012 Summer Olympics
Water polo coaches at the 2016 Summer Olympics
Water polo coaches at the 2020 Summer Olympics
People from Syracuse, Sicily
Sportspeople from the Province of Syracuse